The McComb Micropolitan Statistical Area is a micropolitan area in southwestern Mississippi that includes Amite, and Pike Counties, which had a combined population of 53,124 as of the 2020 census.

Counties
Amite
Pike

Communities

Incorporated places
Centreville (mostly in Wilkinson County)
Crosby (partly in Wilkinson County)
Gloster
Liberty
Magnolia
McComb (Principal City)
Osyka
Summit

Unincorporated places
Chatawa
Fernwood
Pricedale

Demographics
As of the census of 2000, there were 52,539 people, 20,063 households, and 14,381 families residing within the μSA. The racial makeup was 52.59% White, 46.26% African American, 0.17% Native American, 0.26% Asian, 0.01% Pacific Islander, 0.20% from other races, and 0.50% from two or more races. Hispanic or Latino of any race were 0.76% of the population.

The median income for a household in the μSA was $25,298, and the median income for a family was $30,336. Males had a median income of $27,878 versus $16,789 for females. The per capita income for the μSA was $14,044.

See also
List of metropolitan areas in Mississippi
List of micropolitan areas in Mississippi
List of cities in Mississippi
List of towns and villages in Mississippi
List of census-designated places in Mississippi
List of United States metropolitan areas

References

 
Geography of Amite County, Mississippi
Geography of Pike County, Mississippi